The National Treasury Employees Union (NTEU) is an independent labor union representing 150,000 employees of  31 departments and agencies of the United States government. The union specializes in representation of non-supervisory federal employees in every classification and pay level in civilian agencies.

History

In 1938, a group of employees working in Wisconsin as Internal Revenue Collectors formed the National Association of Employees of Collectors of the Internal Revenue (NAECIR) with the goal of securing civil service protection, fair salaries and improved working conditions. Convinced that attempts to secure these rights and benefits through existing organizations would be futile, employees in the Bureau’s Wisconsin District began to organize a group devoted exclusively to the interests of Internal Revenue employees. In October 1939, the first NAECIR Convention was held in Milwaukee to launch a permanent national organization.

When the agency was re-organized as the Internal Revenue Service in 1952, NAECIR broadened its scope to include all IRS workers, adopted a shorter name—the National Association of Internal Revenue Employees (NAIRE) -- and refocused its objectives to attract new members. At this point, IRS management officials and supervisors made up much of NAIRE’s leadership and membership. While NAIRE attempted to function as a professional association, seeking to meet the specialized needs of IRS employees through congressional letter-writing campaigns, consultation with high-ranking IRS administrators, and social activities, due to management’s dominating influence it remained weak, possessing neither definite goals nor the strong organizational structure required to promote the interests of its members. But in the early 1960s, management’s influence in NAIRE was eliminated through the issuance of executive orders that banned supervisors and managers from participation in NAIRE’s activities.

In 1966, newly elected national president Vincent L. Connery and his supporters defeated a proposed merger into the larger American Federation of Government Employees (AFGE). They launched organizing campaigns, adopted a new constitution, and began transformation from a social club into an active labor union. NAIRE received its charter as a federal employee union in 1967. In 1973, the union expanded again to include members throughout the Treasury Department and the organization's name was updated to the National Treasury Employees Union (NTEU); and the new NTEU began its drive to gain representation of the 13,000 U.S. Customs Service employees who were represented by either the National Customs Service Association (NCSA) or AFGE (which was raiding NCSA units). In 1975, with a guarantee to NCSA of participation in governing NTEU, a merger took place, representing the first group of non-IRS employees to be brought into NTEU. In 1977, it began to organize employees in other federal agencies; in 1978, employees of the Federal Communications Commission (FCC) became the first members outside the Treasury Department.

In August 1983, Connery retired as NTEU’s national president and Robert M. Tobias, national executive vice president and general counsel, succeeded him. In August 1999, Colleen M. Kelley was first elected national president.

Legal action

The NTEU has been famous for aggressive use of the courts to supplement their statutorily-limited powers to bargain and restraints on traditional labor tactics such as strikes and boycotts. In 1972, the union sued President Richard M. Nixon, challenging his decision to bypass Congress and postpone salary increases for all federal workers covered by the General Schedule. This lawsuit, NTEU v. Nixon, resulted in an unprecedented victory that required the government to pay over $533 million in back pay to federal employees. In another lawsuit, Boyce and Dixon v. United States, the removal of two IRS service center employees was reversed, establishing for the first time the principles that an agency did not have total discretion in penalizing employees and that mitigating circumstances could render an agency-ordered removal an abuse of discretion. Shortly thereafter, in NTEU v. Fasser, the union won the right for federal employees to engage in informational picketing, an action previously deemed banned by federal law. During the Reagan and first Bush administrations, NTEU participated aggressively in numerous court battles. It took the issue of the constitutionality of random drug testing of Customs inspectors all the way to the U.S. Supreme Court in NTEU v. Von Raab and it successfully fought initiatives it viewed as anti-worker proposed by the head of the Office of Personnel Management (OPM).

On May 18, 2007, the Federal Labor Relations Authority (FLRA) certified NTEU as the sole representative of some 21,000 bargaining unit employees in the Bureau of Customs and Border Protection (CBP).

At the time of its formation in the Department of Homeland Security, CBP was made up of employees from three legacy agencies—the U.S. Customs Service, where NTEU had long been the representative; the Immigration and Naturalization Service and the Agriculture Department. In addition to these employees, CBP new hires since that time who did not have the benefit of a union presence will now be represented by NTEU.

The three-member FLRA, which oversees federal sector labor relations, rejected the final appeal of a losing union in a representation election last year covering the CBP workforce. NTEU won that election by more than a two-to-one margin—7,349 to 3,426.

Representation

NTEU represents some 150,000 employees nationwide and in the U.S. Virgin Islands, Puerto Rico, and Canada who work for:

Department of Agriculture
 Farm Service Agency
 Food, Nutrition and Consumer Services
Department of Commerce
 Patent and Trademark Office
Department of Energy
Department of Health and Human Services
 Administration for Children and Families
 Administration for Community Living
 Food and Drug Administration
 Health Resources and Services Administration
 Indian Health Service
 National Center for Health Statistics
 Office of the Secretary
 Program Support Center
 Substance Abuse and Mental Health Services Administration
Department of Homeland Security
 U. S. Customs and Border Protection
Department of the Interior
 National Park Service
Department of the Treasury
 Bureau of Engraving and Printing
 Bureau of the Fiscal Service
 Departmental Offices
 Internal Revenue Service
 Office of Chief Counsel
 Office of the Comptroller of the Currency
 Tax and Trade Bureau
Commodity Futures Trading Commission
Consumer Financial Protection Bureau
Environmental Protection Agency
Federal Communications Commission
Federal Deposit Insurance Corporation
Federal Election Commission
National Credit Union Administration
Nuclear Regulatory Commission
Securities and Exchange Commission
Social Security Administration
 Office of Hearing Operations

References

External links

 
 NTEU history

Trade unions in the United States
Civil service trade unions
Trade unions established in 1939